The Drever is  a breed of dog, a short-legged scenthound from Sweden used for hunting deer and other game. The Drever is descended from the Westphalian Dachsbracke, a type of German hound called Bracke. The breed name Drever was chosen through a contest in 1947.

Appearance 
The Drever's most noticeable characteristics are its long body and short legs, inherited from the Westphalian Dachsbracke, but as a working dog these features are not exaggerated. It has short fur, and is of any color with white markings (but not all white, which has been linked to deafness.) The breed has the typical drop (hanging) ears of a hound, and a long tail. The maximum height of a Drever is 38 cm (15 ins) at the withers, which is about 15 cm (approx. 6 ins) shorter than a long legged hunting hound with the same size body. The Westphalian Dachsbracke is about 2 cm (less than an inch) shorter than the Drever.

Hunting 
Most breeds with similar physical traits are bred for a single purpose, but the Drever has been bred to hunt all sizes of game, both hares and roe deer, and is also used to hunt fox and red deer. The Drever has a lot of stamina, and has become a popular hunting hound for deer hunters in northern Norway, Sweden, and Finland as a change in legislation allowed the use of drevers in deer hunting. Roe deer are nervous quarry, and the hounds which are used to hunt them must move slowly, especially in areas where heavy snow can be expected in late autumn.  This is given as the reason for breeding of a dog with a medium-sized body but short legs.

The Drever in Sweden is usually kept as a hunting hound and is not usually found as a pet.

History and recognition
The Drever is a Swedish breed originating with the Westphalian Dachsbracke (a small hound for tracking deer), brought from Germany to Sweden around 1910,  and crossbred with other hounds to adjust "to Swedish terrain and game." By the 1940s there were two distinctive sizes of the Dachsbracke, and a newspaper contest was held in 1947 to choose the new name for the slightly larger variety; Drever was chosen, from the Swedish word drev, referring to a type of hunt where the dogs drive the game towards the hunter. The Drever was then recognised by the Swedish Kennel Club as a separate breed in 1947. The breed is recognised internationally by the Fédération Cynologique Internationale, in Group 6 Scenthounds and related breeds, Section 1.3, Small-sized Hounds.

The Drever  was recognized by the Canadian Kennel Club in 1956 in the Hound Group,  and in 1996 by the United Kennel Club in its Scenthound Group. The breed is also recognized by a long list of minor registries, rare breed groups, hunting clubs, and internet registry businesses, and is promoted in North America as a rare breed pet. It is not currently recognized by The Kennel Club (UK), the Australian National Kennel Council or the New Zealand Kennel Club, or the American Kennel Club.

Health 
Specific health problems or claims of extraordinary health have not been documented for this breed. According to the breed standard, the Drever should be alert and self-possessed, with an affable, even temperament, and should not be aggressive or shy.

See also
 Dogs portal
 List of dog breeds
Westphalian Dachsbracke and the closely related Deutsche Bracke
Dachshund a short-legged Bracke
Hunting dog
Hound

References

External links

 Drever The American Drever Association
 Drever information on Canada Dogs
 The Swedish Drever Club (in Swedish)
 The Finnish Drever Club (in Finnish)

Dog breeds originating in Sweden
FCI breeds
Scent hounds